The city of Shenzhen, Guangdong, China is surrounded by numerous islands. Nonetheless, a significant portion of them falls under the territory of adjacent areas such as Hong Kong Special Administrative Region and Huiyang District, Huizhou. There are several islands under Shenzhen's jurisdiction, listed as follow.

List

See also
List of islands and peninsulas of Hong Kong

References

Shenzhen-related lists
Geography of Shenzhen

zh:深圳岛屿